Karlo Stipanić (born 8 December 1941) is a former Croatian water polo player, most notable for winning a silver medal at the 1964 Summer Olympics in Tokyo, and a gold medal in Mexico City in 1968, with the Yugoslavian water polo team.

See also
 Yugoslavia men's Olympic water polo team records and statistics
 List of Olympic champions in men's water polo
 List of Olympic medalists in water polo (men)
 List of men's Olympic water polo tournament goalkeepers

External links
 

1941 births
Living people
Croatian male water polo players
Yugoslav male water polo players
Water polo goalkeepers
Olympic water polo players of Yugoslavia
Olympic gold medalists for Yugoslavia
Olympic silver medalists for Yugoslavia
Water polo players at the 1964 Summer Olympics
Water polo players at the 1968 Summer Olympics
Water polo players at the 1972 Summer Olympics
Olympic medalists in water polo
Medalists at the 1968 Summer Olympics
Medalists at the 1964 Summer Olympics